Nuno Borges (born February 19, 1997) is a Portuguese tennis player. Borges has a career high ATP singles ranking of world No. 68 achieved on 20 March 2023 and a doubles ranking of world No. 69 achieved on 19 September 2022. Borges has a career high ITF juniors ranking of World No. 44 achieved on 13 April 2015.

College career
Borges played US college tennis at the Mississippi State University between 2015 and 2019. He was NCAA singles runner-up in 2019, ITA National Player of the year in 2019 and won the SEC Player of the Year Award three times (2017, 2018, 2019), having ranked #1 in both singles and doubles at the National level.

Professional career

2021-22: Tour debut, ATP and 6 Challenger titles, Top 100 in singles & doubles
Borges made his ATP debut at the 2021 Estoril Open after qualifying for the singles draw. He then defeated Jordan Thompson in the first round to win his first ATP match and lost against former US Open champion Marin Čilić in the second round.
He repeated the same feat at the 2022 Estoril Open where he also reached the second round as a wildcard after Pablo Andujar retirement but lost to Frances Tiafoe.

Borges won two ATP Challenger singles titles and nine doubles titles with Francisco Cabral, a record doubles of six in 2021.

He reached the top 100 in doubles after a semifinal and first ATP final showing at the 2022 Estoril Open with Cabral as a wildcard pair where they defeated the top seeded pair Jamie Murray and Michael Venus en route. They became the first Portuguese pair to reach and win the final at their home tournament, and have done so on their ATP doubles debut.

At the 2022 French Open Borges qualified to make his Grand Slam main draw singles debut.

He also qualified for his second Grand Slam of the year at the 2022 Wimbledon Championships as a lucky loser after the late withdrawal of Marin Cilic. In doubles at the same tournament he reached the second round on his doubles Major debut partnering with Cabral.

He qualified for his third straight Grand Slam at the US Open defeating Francesco Maestrelli in a third set super tiebreak. He won his first round match against wildcard Ben Shelton. In doubles he reached the second round partnering again with Cabral. As a result he moved into the top 100 in the singles rankings at world No. 93 and into the top 70 in doubles on 12 September 2022.

2023: Australian Open and Top 75 debuts
He made his debut at the 2023 Australian Open where he lost in the first round to Lorenzo Sonego.

At the 2023 Delray Beach Open he qualified for the main draw defeating Steve Johnson (tennis) whom he defeated again in the first round. He lost in the second round to eventual runner-up Miomir Kecmanovic. 

He reached the top 85 after winning his first title of the season at the 2023 Monterrey Challenger, Mexico defeating Borna Gojo in the final and the top 70 after a second title and biggest title of his career at the Phoenix Challenger, Arizona.

ATP career finals

Doubles: 1 (1 title)

Future and Challenger finals

Singles: 25 (14–11)

Doubles: 25 (16–9)

Record against top 10 players

Borges' record against those who have been ranked in the top 10, with active players in boldface.

Davis Cup

Participations: (4–3)

   indicates the outcome of the Davis Cup match followed by the score, date, place of event, the zonal classification and its phase, and the court surface.

References

External links

1997 births
Living people
Portuguese male tennis players
People from Maia, Portugal
Mississippi State Bulldogs tennis players
Sportspeople from Porto District
21st-century Portuguese people